Bright School and College is a co-educational school in Dhaka, Bangladesh.

Further reading
 
 

Schools in Dhaka District
2002 establishments in Bangladesh